Methanobrevibacter wolinii is a species of methanogen archaeon, named after Meyer J. Wolin.

Description
Coccobacillus with slightly tapered ends, about t 0.6 micrometres in width and 1.0-1.4 micrometres in length, occurring in pairs or short chains. Gram-positive reaction. Its cell walls are composed of pseudomurein. It is a strict anaerobe and its type strain is SHT (=DSM 11976T =OCM 814T). It was first isolated from sheep faeces.

References

Further reading

External links
LPSN

Euryarchaeota
Archaea described in 2002